Stefmerie Halstead, sometimes credited as Stefanie Halstead, is an American actress and writer. She is known for her work in Fool's Gold, Roadside Massacre, and The Ape.

Biography
Stefmerie received her education in ballet from Boston Ballet.

In April 2018, she received an award for her role in UndercoverUp.

Filmography  
 Fool's Gold (2005)
 The Ape (2005)
 Venous Red (2009)
 Southbound Heist (2011)
 My San Joaquin (2011)
 Roadside Massacre (2012)
 Hollywood Road Trip (2015)
 Moment of Anger (2016)
 UndercoverUp (2018)
 The Gallows Act II (2019)
 The Fruit (2019)

Bibliography 
 Halstead, Stefmerie (2021). The Night of the Festival
 Halstead, Stefmerie (2021). The Clock Rings The Town To Sleep

Awards 
 Best Horror Screenplay, Action On Film International Film Festival (2012)
 Best Female Filmmaker, Action On Film International Film Festival (2013)

References 

Living people
21st-century American actresses
21st-century American writers
21st-century American women writers
Year of birth missing (living people)